Ben Azariah may refer to:

Daniel ben Azariah (11th-century), the gaon of the Land of Israel from 1051 till 1062
Eleazar ben Azariah, a 1st-century CE Jewish tanna, i.e. Mishnaic sage

See also
Azariah